Beyond All Limits is a 1959 Mexican drama film directed by Roberto Gavaldón. It was entered into the 9th Berlin International Film Festival.

Cast
 María Félix - Magdalena Gombai
 Jack Palance - Jim Gatsby
 Pedro Armendáriz - Pepe Gamboa
 Carlos Montalbán - Nacho
 Domingo Soler - Priest
 Jorge Martínez de Hoyos - Rafael Ortega
 Emma Roldán - Carmela
 Humberto Almazán
 Agustín Fernández
 Pedro Galván
 Enrique Lucero
 Juan Múzquiz - Pepito
 Alberto Pedret
 Paul Stewart - Pendergast
 José Torvay

External links

1959 films
1950s Spanish-language films
1959 drama films
María Félix
Films directed by Roberto Gavaldón
Seafaring films
Films about fishing
Mexican drama films
1950s Mexican films